is a public park in Nerima Ward, Tokyo, Japan.

Facilities
Water square
Sun plaza
Square of the four seasons
Fountain
Athletics stadium (400m all-weather track; free of charge for individuals)
Baseball field (with night equipment; there is a charge for use)

Access
By train:
44 minutes’ walk from Ōizumi-gakuen Station on the  Seibu Ikebukuro Line

See also
 Parks and gardens in Tokyo
 National Parks of Japan

References

 Website of Tokyo Convention & Visitors Bureau

External links
 Website of Tokyo Metropolitan Park Association (in Japanese)
Parks and gardens in Tokyo